Pappocetus is an extinct protocetid cetacean known from the Eocene of Nigeria and Togo.

The type specimen BMNH M11414 an incomplete left mandible with symphysis, a deciduous premolar, and unerupted molars.  It was found in Bartonian layers of the Ameki Formation (paleocoordinates ) in southern Nigeria.

The specimen M11086 is a left mandibular ramus broken in three pieces with sockets for canines and incisors and the front part of a single-rooted P1.  Andrews, to whom the two specimens were brought separately, noted that they "to some extent supplement one another, so that the structure is fairly clear" and thus estimated the size and morphology of the missing parts by comparing the specimens to each other.

Pappocetus differs from all other known protocetid genera by the step-like notch on the ventral margin of the mandible below M2 and M3; from Indocetus and Rodhocetus by the deciduous double-rooted P1; from Protocetus and Babiacetus by the presence of accessory cuspules; and from Babiacetus by the unfused symphysis terminating just before P3.  Its molar morphology is similar to Georgiacetus and its estimated body size to that of Eocetus.

The species is named after Sir Frederick Lugard who sent one of the specimens to Andrews.

Notes

References

 
 

Protocetidae
Fossil taxa described in 1920
Prehistoric cetacean genera
Eocene mammals of Africa